Sarge was an indie rock band from Champaign, Illinois, in the United States.  They released three albums on Mud Records.

About 
Sarge was formed in Champaign, Illinois by singer-songwriter, Elizabeth Elmore and bassist, Rachel Switzky. They later recruited a drummer, Chad Romanski. A second guitarist, Pat Cramer, volunteered to work for the band later. The band's first gig was at the Blind Pig in January 1996.

The band was considered "punk rock" and called "thoroughly solid" by CMJ New Music Monthly. In 1999, the Chicago Tribune called the band a "well-honed pop group." The band broke up in 1999 when Elmore returned to law school.

Discography
Sarge released albums on Mud Records, as well as released a number of singles.

Albums
Charcoal (CD/LP) – Mud Records (1996)
The Glass Intact (CD/LP) – Mud Records (1998)
Distant (CD) – Mud Records (2000)

Singles
"Dear Josie, Love Robyn"/"The Last Boy" (7") – Mud Records (1996)
"Stall"/"Time After Time" (7") – Mud Records (1997)

References

Indie rock musical groups from Illinois
Musical groups established in 1996
Musical groups disestablished in 2000
1996 establishments in Illinois
Musical quartets